Verkiai Regional Park is one of the Regional Parks in Lithuania. It is located almost entirely in Verkiai elderate of Vilnius municipality.

The park was established in 1992 in order to protect natural complexes of the Green (Žalieji) Lakes and cultural complexes of Verkiai Palace and a park, Kalvarijos and Trinapolis as well as other valuables. The park occupies 2,673 ha (compared to 5,565 ha of the elderate), being one of the biggest city parks in the world. Forests cover 76.5%, reserves occupy 52.7%, and 23.9% of the territory is designated for recreation.

Verkiai Calvary were established in the 17th century. The Calvary was completed in 1669 by the supervision of Dominican friars. It was constructed following the plan of Jerusalem, with the distances, water bodies and elevations being very close to the original. New chapels were constructed in the 18th century in Baroque style. Verkiai Calvary consists of 22 chapels, 7 wooden and brick gates, and two church ensembles. The Calvary have been visited by Christian worshipers from Vilnius region and abroad yearly in Pentecost. Almost all stations were completely destroyed in 1962 under the Soviet rule. After regaining the independence the reconstruction was started. Last chapels were rebuilt in 2002. Today the entire complex is reconstructed and is proclaimed an architectural monument of national significance.

Gallery

External links
Information from the official website

Regional parks of Lithuania
Geography of Vilnius
Tourist attractions in Vilnius
Verkiai